Baranik is a surname. Notable people with the surname include:

 Dan Baranik (born 1962), American football coach
 Rudolf Baranik (1920–1998), Lithuania-American artist, educator, and writer
 Valeriia Baranik (born 1993), Russian female handballer